Guembeul Natural Reserve (fr. Réserve spéciale de faune de Guembeul) is a natural reserve located about 10 km south of Saint-Louis, Senegal, in the Gandiol region.  It covers an area of 720 hectares, and was designated an IUCN category IV Faunal Reserve in 1983.

The park is home to many species of birds, reptiles and mammals.  The site is also the center for reintroduction programs of three species of gazelles and is home to the African spurred tortoise.

References

External Links 
World Database of Protected Areas record.
UNEP site factsheet, 1986.
Ministre de l'Environnement et de la Protection de la Nature: parks listings.

Parks in Senegal
Saint-Louis, Senegal
Protected areas established in 1983
Nature reserves in Senegal
Ramsar sites in Senegal